Långasjö is a locality situated in Emmaboda Municipality, Kalmar County, Sweden with 348 inhabitants in 2010.

References

External links 

Populated places in Kalmar County
Populated places in Emmaboda Municipality
Värend